Agaseata Valelio Tanuvasa (born ~1964) is a Samoan politician and member of the Legislative Assembly of Samoa. He is a member of the FAST Party.

Tanuvasa is from Nofoali'i and was educated at Nofoalii Primary School and Avele College. He trained as a teacher, and served as principal of Nofoalii Primary School for ten years. He was first elected to the Legislative Assembly of Samoa in the April 2021 Samoan general election. On 28 July 2021 he was appointed Associate Minister of Education.

References

Living people
People from A'ana
Members of the Legislative Assembly of Samoa
Faʻatuatua i le Atua Samoa ua Tasi politicians
Samoan educators
Year of birth missing (living people)